Antonis Papantoniou (1924 – unknown) was a Greek footballer who played for Panathinaikos between 1946 and 1950. He featured once for the Greece national football team in 1949, scoring a hat-trick against Syria. He was the brother of fellow Greek international footballer Giannis Papantoniou.

Career statistics

International

International goals
Scores and results list Greece's goal tally first, score column indicates score after each Greece goal.

References

1924 births
Date of death unknown
Greek footballers
Greece international footballers
Association football forwards
Panathinaikos F.C. players